Ficus sphenophylla is a species of fig tree in the family Moraceae. It is found in Bolivia, Brazil, Colombia, and Peru.

References

sphenophylla
Least concern plants
Taxonomy articles created by Polbot